Windsor is a city in Shelby County, Illinois, United States. The population was 1,079 at the 2020 census.

Geography

Demographics

As of the census of 2000, there were 1,125 people, 466 households, and 317 families residing in the city. The racial makeup of the city was 98.84% White, 0.36% from other races, and 0.80% from two or more races. Hispanic or Latino of any race were 0.44% of the population.

There were 466 households, out of which 32.0% had children under the age of 18 living with them, 54.7% were married couples living together, 10.3% had a female householder with no husband present, and 31.8% were non-families. 27.9% of all households were made up of individuals, and 15.0% had someone living alone who was 65 years of age or older. The average household size was 2.41 and the average family size was 2.93.

In the city, the population was spread out, with 26.2% under the age of 18, 8.5% from 18 to 24, 26.7% from 25 to 44, 21.4% from 45 to 64, and 17.2% who were 65 years of age or older. The median age was 38 years. For every 100 females, there were 88.4 males. For every 100 females age 18 and over, there were 85.7 males.

The median income for a household in the city was $33,095, and the median income for a family was $40,250. Males had a median income of $27,100 versus $20,000 for females. The per capita income for the city was $16,002. About 6.5% of families and 8.4% of the population were below the poverty line, including 11.5% of those under age 18 and 9.9% of those age 65 or over.

Climate

References

External links
Windsor Illinois - Home Page

Cities in Shelby County, Illinois
Cities in Illinois